Caveat is Latin for "beware". In Australian property law, a caveat is a warning that someone other than the owner claims some right over or nonregistered interest in the property. Caveats can include ongoing court cases, bad debts or second mortgages.

The lodging of caveats
According to Samantha Hepburn, "caveat's function as notification of an interest: once lodged they do not guarantee any title".

A person acquires a "caveatable interest" (that means the buyer is entitled to place a caveat to defend that interest) when he/she purchase real estate. The Registrar of Titles must notify the caveator before deal with the property.

It's important to note that the caveator should be to find the right time to place the caveat. First person to place the caveat is will be the legal property owner, for example.

There are a lot of people who can place the caveat.

Withdrawal of caveats
The caveator can withdraw their caveat at any time. The Land Titles Office cannot register any transactions regarding the estate while a caveat applies.

A lapsing notice will require the caveator to commence Supreme Court proceedings and obtain an extension of the caveat within days of the date on which the notice was served. If the caveator does not take action, the caveat will lapse.

References

Sources

Further reading
 

Australian property law
Consumer protection in Australia